Twice Brightly is a 1974 comic novel by Harry Secombe, fictionalising his experiences as a recently demobbed Welsh serviceman and army comic returning from the battlefields of North Africa and Italy and struggling to make a living in the British Variety Theatres after the Second World War.  The lead character is a Welsh comic called Larry Gower, Secombe's alter ego.  The title is a pun on the phrase "twice nightly".

Plot summary
For young servicemen who had spent six years fighting fascism, postwar Britain was a drab, oppressive place. For a young and untried army comic keen on the Marx brothers and Jimmy Cagney, a Yorkshire Variety theatre in February was a vision of Hell itself.

Film, TV or theatrical adaptations
It was dramatised as a 60-minute Radio 4 radio play by Harry's son David Secombe in 2006, first broadcast that year and repeated on Saturday 19 May 2007.  This ended with Gower as a success, leaving for London to take part in "Crazy People", a play by his fellow ex-soldier and comic Jim Moriarty - this is a fictionalisation of the initial stages of the Goon Show, and Moriarty (deriving his name from the Goon character Count Jim Moriarty) is a fictionalised Spike Milligan.

Cast
Larry Gower (Secombe's alter ego)...... Christian Patterson
Wally ...... Dominic Frisby
Tom ...... Philip Jackson
Julie ...... Becky Hindley
April ...... Katy Secombe (Harry's daughter)
June ...... Ella Smith
Joe ...... Gerard McDermott
Jim ...... John Cummins
Mrs Ma Rogers, landlady ...... Carolyn Pickles
Hubert ...... Geoffrey Beevers
Director Steven Canny

1974 British novels
Welsh novels
British comedy novels
Anglo-Welsh novels